Dr. Kovács István is a 1942 Hungarian drama film directed by Viktor Bánky and starring Antal Páger, Erzsi Simor and Júlia Tóth. When his new wife from a peasant background is not accepted by his colleagues, a University Professor resigns his post and returns home to his rural village. After receiving popular support, he is returned to his position by the Minister of Education. The film was made during the Second World War and reflects the nationalist ideology of the country's government. The film's views show the influence of Hungarian Turanism. The film was popular with audiences on its release, and Bánky released a second nationalist film Changing the Guard the same year.

The production manager was Ernő Gottesmann.

Main cast
 Antal Páger as Dr. Kovács István egyetemi tanár 
 Erzsi Simor as Tatár Ada 
 Júlia Tóth as Balogh Ágnes  
 Margit Ladomerszky as Tatárné 
 Piri Vaszary as Szabónõ 
 Margit Vágóné as Dr. Kovács édesanyja 
 Gábor Rajnay as Dékán 
 Béla Mihályffi as Lakos Kálmán professzor 
 György Kürthy as Tatár ügyvéd 
 Tibor Puskás as Tatár Tibor, az ügyvéd fia 
 Gyula Benkö as Holben egyetemista 
 Lajos Gárday as Altiszt 
 Mici Haraszti as Lakosné 
 Hilda Gobbi as Kalaposnõ 
 Marcsa Simon as Dr. Kovács házvezetõnõje 
 János Pásztor as Ferkó, Dr. Kovács öccse 
 Lajos Sugár as Fõpincér

References

Bibliography
 Cunningham, John. Hungarian Cinema: From Coffee House to Multiplex. Wallflower Press, 2004.

External links

1942 films
1942 drama films
Hungarian drama films
1940s Hungarian-language films
Films directed by Viktor Bánky
Hungarian Turanism
Hungarian black-and-white films